The Conservatorium van Amsterdam (CvA) is a Dutch conservatoire of music located in Amsterdam. This school is the music division of the Amsterdam University of the Arts, the city's vocational university of arts. The Conservatorium van Amsterdam is the largest music academy in the Netherlands, offering programs in classical music, jazz, pop, early music, music education, and opera.

History

The oldest predecessor of the Conservatorium van Amsterdam was founded in 1884 as the Amsterdamsch Conservatorium, four years before the completion of the Concertgebouw. In 1920, a competing music academy was established in Amsterdam by a society called 'Muzieklyceum'. The Bachzaal, used by the Amsterdamsch Conservatorium, was completed in 1931.

In 1976, the Amsterdamsch Conservatorium, Conservatory of the Muzieklyceum Society, and the Haarlems Muzieklyceum merged to form the Sweelinck Conservatorium. This "new" academy of music moved to the former savings bank building in the Van Baerlestraat in 1985. In 1994 the Sweelinck Conservatorium merged with Hilversums Conservatorium to form the Conservatorium van Amsterdam. From 1998 its training programmes took place in their facilities in Van Baerlestraat and the Nieuwe Vaart. In 2008 the school moved to Oosterdokseiland.

Building

Since April 21, 2008, the Conservatorium van Amsterdam has its home in a new building at the Oosterdokseiland, near Amsterdam Central Station. The new building is centrally located in a cultural area, including the 'Muziekgebouw' with three concert halls for classical music and jazz, and the public library. Other faculties of the Amsterdam University of the Arts (Amsterdamse Hogeschool voor de Kunsten in Dutch) are within walking distance.

This new complex is designed and equipped to current standards. Students can organize solo or ensemble concerts, create interesting projects with other music students or students from other art disciplines. They also make their own posters and flyers, sell tickets, or record their concerts in one of the concert halls and broadcast them on the internet radio at the CvA website.

The design, by Dutch architect Frits van Dongen, is based on the 'Engawa model', the Japanese way of building, where the corridors are situated next to the outer walls of the building and the concert halls, classrooms and study rooms, within. Large windows in the front transmits sufficient daylight into the rooms. This building method is intended to enable students to study without being disturbed, while corridors keep noises out.

The new building contains three units. At ground level there are four halls:
 Bernard Haitinkzaal, a large hall with 450 seats
 Amsterdam Blue Note, a hall for jazz and pop concerts, which seats 200
 Sweelinckzaal, a recital hall with 120 seats
 Theaterzaal, which seats 50

The Bernard Haitinkzaal and Sweelinckzaal have windows which transmit daylight, which is exceptional for a concert hall. All halls have recording equipment, so that each concert or playing exam can be recorded. There is also a foyer and a canteen at ground level.

At the next level there are four floors with lesson and classrooms and on top of these there are two floors with the library, a lecture hall and study rooms.

Acoustic planning was by Akoestisch bureau Peutz, who researched the acoustic requirements of the lesson and study rooms and concert halls.

People

Directors 

 Ton Hartsuiker

Faculty

Current

 Richard Ayres
 Boris Belkin
 Ilya Grubert
 Willem Jeths
 Peter Kooy
 Anna Korsun
 Jaap ter Linden
 Bart van Oort
 Tjako van Schie
 Ed Spanjaard
 Jos van Veldhoven

Emeriti

 Willem Andriessen (also an alumnus)
 Oskar Back
 Klaas Bolt
 Sarah Bosmans-Benedicts
 Max van Egmond
 Peter Erős
 Vesko Eschkenazy
 Wim Henderickx
 Herman Krebbers
 Ton de Leeuw
 Gustav Leonhardt
 Murray Perahia
 António Chagas Rosa
 Jaap Spaanderman (also an alumnus)
 Theo Verbey
 Matthijs Verschoor (also an alumnus)
 Abbie de Quant

Alumni

 Svitlana Azarova
 Kees Bakels
 Pieter-Jan Belder
 Bart Berman
 Coenraad Bloemendal
 Hendrik Bouman
 Frans Brüggen
 Theo Bruins
 Sytse Buwalda
 Hans Davidsson
 Thoms Dunn
 Caro Emerald
 Ivo van Emmerik
 Tom Gaebel
 Sim Gokkes
 Bernard Haitink
 Majoie Hajary
 Walter Hekster
 Robert Hill
 Ilse Huizinga
 Jorge Isaac
 Christine Kamp
 Rudolf Koelman
 Reinbert de Leeuw
 Charles van der Leeuw
 Theo Loevendie
 Daniel Moult
 Ben van Oosten
 Tera de Marez Oyens
 Ella van Poucke
 Lawrence Renes
 Martin Schmeding
 Cameron Shahbazi
 Paul Gutama Soegijo
 Marjo Tal
 Signe Tollefsen
 Merlijn Twaalfhoven
 Geertruida Vladeracken
 Frank Peter Zimmermann
 Uxia Martinez Botana

See also
Dispokinesis

References

External links
 Official Website in Dutch
 Official Website in English

 
1884 in the Netherlands
Amsterdam University of the Arts
Music schools in the Netherlands